Blandfordia cunninghamii is one of four species of flowering plant commonly known as Christmas bells. It is a tufted, perennial herb endemic to the Blue Mountains and Illawarra regions of eastern Australia. It has long, narrow, linear leaves and between twelve and thirty large, drooping, cylindrical to bell-shaped red flowers with yellow tips.

Description
The flower tube is narrower for about one-third of its length before suddenly expanding to a bell-shaped tip. The flower is usually red with yellow lobes. The stamens are attached to the inside wall of the flower tube, just below its middle.

Taxonomy and naming
Blandfordia cunningamii was first formally described in 1845 by John Lindley who published the description in Edwards's Botanical Register.

Distribution and habitat
This species of Christmas bells grows in damp, shallow soil, often near cliffs. It is only found in the Blue Mountains and on Mount Kembla in the Illawarra region of New South Wales. Flowering appears to be indirectly stimulated by rainfall in September and by bushfire the previous summer.

References 

Flora of New South Wales
Blandfordiaceae
Plants described in 1845